In Mandaeism, Yufin-Yufafin or Yupin-Yupapin is an uthra (angel or guardian) in the World of Light. In the Ginza Rabba, Yufin-Yufafin is mentioned in Books 3 and 5.4 of the Right Ginza and Book 1 of the Left Ginza, whereas "Yufin-Uthra" is mentioned in Book 4 of the Right Ginza. He is also mentioned in many Qolasta prayers, including prayers 5, 9, 22, 28, 46, 77, 105, and 171, in which he is often mentioned along with uthras such as Sam Mana Smira and Nbaṭ.

Etymology
Nathaniel Deutsch (2000) links Yufin-Yufafin with Yophiel, one of the names of the angel Metatron in Jewish mysticism. Deutsch also observes many parallels between Metatron and Abatur.

See also
 List of angels in theology

References

Individual angels
Uthras